"The Art of Discourse" is the twenty-second episode of the first season of the American comedy television series Community. It aired in the United States on NBC on April 29, 2010.

Plot 
Abed (Danny Pudi) reveals to the group his film-based social goals of an ideal first year of college. This includes pulling down someone's pants and having the same done to him, which quickly happens between him and Troy (Donald Glover). Pierce (Chevy Chase), wanting to get in on the joke, proceeds to pull down Shirley's (Yvette Nicole Brown) pants, greatly offending her. When Pierce refuses to apologize for what he sees as a harmless joke, the group decides to kick him out. However, they quickly realize that with Pierce gone, there is no scapegoat for them to throw their hatred at. This leads them to try and get Pierce to apologize, but when he botches the attempt, Shirley decides to leave the group herself. Ironically, this leads to Shirley and Pierce bonding in the library.

While Troy helps Abed complete his goals, Jeff (Joel McHale) and Britta (Gillian Jacobs) find themselves at the mercy of a group of high schoolers taking early classes, who make fun of them for attending community college. Plotting revenge, they eventually decide to have Jeff seduce the ring leader's mother. It initially works until she discovers the truth and begins acting like the kids. This culminates in Jeff and Britta going into a massive mimicry battle with the high schoolers in the cafeteria that lasts several minutes. The battle culminates in Shirley and Pierce pulling down the kids' pants, distracting them enough to lose. As a last resort, the kids start a food fight, which was another item on Abed's list.

In the end tag, Troy and Abed are in the student lounge, discussing their "porn names" which they derived from their grade school and their favorite soft drink.

Continuity
Pierce thought Shirley was Troy's mother in "Introduction to Film".
The closing sequence states that Britta becomes the proud owner of an iPod Nano in 2014; she receives it in the season 5 episode "Cooperative Polygraphy".

Cultural references 
Abed and Troy's storyline parodies comedy films set at colleges and universities, in particular the 1978 film Animal House. References include Abed destroying Pierce's guitar, Abed and Troy dressing up in togas, and the use of freeze-frame labels at the end of the episode revealing the personal futures of the main characters and single episode characters. Although he wasn't in the film, Chevy Chase, who plays Pierce Hawthorne, worked with a number of the cast and crew of the film, as he worked with National Lampoon, was on the sketch comedy series Saturday Night Live, and was in the 1980 sports comedy film Caddyshack.

Reception 
Around 4.36 million Americans watched "The Art of Discourse".

Emily VanDerWerff of The A.V. Club gave the episode a 'B', saying that while she "liked the other two plotlines in the episode quite a bit" the main Jeff/Britta plot was difficult to enjoy because she "just couldn't get past how irritating the characters were."

References

External links
 "The Art of Discourse" at NBC.com
 

2010 American television episodes
Community (season 1) episodes